The Kingdom of Dagbon (Dagbaŋ) is one of the oldest and most organised traditional kingdoms in Ghana founded by the Dagomba people (Dagbamba) in the 15th century. During its rise, it comprised, at various points, the Northern, Upper West, Upper East, Savannah Region and North East regions of present-day Ghana. It also covered portions of  Burkina Faso, North East Ivory Coast and North West Togo. Since Ghana's independence in 1957, the Kingdom just like all of Ghana's kingdoms and ethnic states has assumed a traditional, customary role.

Oral histories of the Kingdom tell that it was founded by a warrior named Tohazie (c. 1250), who arrived in present-day northern Ghana in the 13th century with his cavalry men from east of Lake Chad, stopping in Zamfara, present-day northern Nigeria, and in the Mali Empire, before settling in northern Ghana. These histories tell of numerous engagements with neighbouring peoples throughout this early period until the early 18th century, when the capital of the kingdom was moved to the city of Yendi by a famous king Naa Luro. Around this time, Islam arrived to the kingdom, and a period of peace and increased trade with neighbouring kingdoms began.

In the late 19th century, Dagbon was threatened at all angles. The Germans were expanding from the East, the British from the South, and the French from the North and East.  The Germans invaded Dagbon in 1896. After the German invasion of Eastern Dagbon at the Battle of Adibo, Eastern Dagbon fell to the Germans. The centuries old Gbewaa Palace was burnt.  Eastern Dagbon became part of German Togoland and Western Dagbon became part of the British Gold Coast. Western Dagbon was a protectorate and not a colony. The British presence prevented further German attacks into Western Dagbon. Following World War I, eastern Dagbon became part of British Togoland. The Gold Coast achieved independence in 1957 an became Ghana. The result of interference of British and German imperialism was a kingdom that was significantly robbed of its once invaluable traditional artifacts, beautiful way of life  and a divided Kingdom whose wounds would not completely heal till the second decade of the 21st Century.

The division of Dagbon by the Germans and British without regard to the peoples history brought several challenges, mainly in its traditional leadership. The Kingdom since around the 1920s has been characterised by repeated succession disputes and conflict mainly from British and German Imperial interference in Dagbon's succession. Several incidents have occurred, including in 2002 when the King of Dagbon Yakubu Andani II, of the Andani royal family, was murdered by the unknown people. As of January 2014, a regent (installed in 2006) has acted as sovereign of the kingdom until a new ruler is chosen. Today, the king of Dagbon's court remains at the city of Yendi. The kingdom is divided into territorial chiefdoms, categorised from divisional to village chieftaincies. The monarch of Dagbon is known as the Ya Naa (also spelt Ya Na, Ya-Na, Yaa Naa Yaan Naa).

On 18 January 2019, a new Yaa Naa, Abubakari Mahama [Naa Gariba II], was chosen in Yendi by the Dagbon state's kingmakers. This was after a peace initiative by the Committee of Eminent Chiefs, consisting of the Yaa Naa brother the Na Yiri, the Asante chief and the Yagbonwura. He was enskinned on 26 January 2019 in Yendi. The Yaa Naa and the Na Yiri are sons of Gbewaa and mediate issues in each other kingdoms from time to time.

History
The Lunsi play a role in preserving Dagbon oral history. The Lunsi of Dagbon constitutes a venerable guild of specialists charged with the solemn duty of preserving historical and genealogical information, duly arranged in accordance with the succession of chiefs and noble lineages. Later history is better known, because, in addition to court historians, there are other sources of information, some of them independent of events in Dagbon itself.

Founding 
The Kingdom of Dagbon, is the homeland of the Dagomba(Dagbamba) people, was founded in the 1480 AD. Accounts of the kingdom's origins, rulers and wars of conquest are preserved in drum histories. These histories narrate the story of Tohazhie, the "Red Hunter", who left Tunga, east of Lake Chad, with a small band of cavalry men into Zamfara, present-day Nigeria, before moving on to Mali. Tohazhie married the daughter of the king of Mali, Pag Wabiga, and fathered a son, Kpoginumbo(Ʒinani).

After serving briefly in Mali, Kpogonumbo and his followers came into conflict with the rising Songhay Empire in western Africa, and reprisal attacks from the Songhay forced Kpogonumbo and his followers southward. Kpogonumbo then seized power and ruled over Biun in Gurma. His son, Naa Gbewaa (or Bawa), left Biun with some of his followers to settle at Pusiga in the northeastern corner of Ghana, where he ruled until he became blind. His grave is currently located at Pusiga in the Upper East Region. Naa Gbewaa's son, Zirili, succeeded him, but succession disputes between three of Zirili's younger brothers–Tohagu, Shitobu and Gmantambo–each of them travelled outward eventually expanding the borders of the Dagbon Kingdoms. Naa Gbewaa remains in the histories of the kingdoms of Dagbon and the kingdoms of the Mamprugu and Nanumba, as their first king, founding their ruling dynasties through these sons.

Naa Gbewaa's children led by his son Shitobu settled briefly at the town of Gambaga before moving south to Namburugu, near Karaga, where he founded the Dagbon state. The king became known as Yaa Naa, meaning "king of strength". As Sitobu moved south, he encountered groups of indigenous peoples. such as the Konkomba, Nafeba, Basare and Chamba, who did not have centralised political structures, except for the office of the tengdana or tindana–the earth priest, literally translated as "owner of the land". The tengdana presided over ritual ceremonies and acted as a mediator between the people and the gods of the land.

Sitobu's son, Naa Nyagsi (r. 1416–1432) succeeded him and embarked on a war of expansion, killing many of the tengdana and holding sway over the indigenous people. Naa Nyagsi established his capital at Yani Dabari, located in the area of Diyali, near Tamale, and developed a stable political organisation by installing his sons, brothers and uncles as rulers over the conquered people. The surviving tengdamba continued to function as earth priests, while some members of the Konkomba were assigned roles in the military.

Relocation of Capital 
In about 1700, the capital was relocated from Yani Dabari to a new city (also known as Yani or Yendi) in the east because of incessant wars with the Gonja people. A major confrontation at Daboya dealt a lot of damage to the Dagomba people. Naa Tutugri retaliated by defeating the Gonja near Yani Dabari, but his successor, Naa Luro, though victorious over the Gonja in a later battle, could not stand the sustained warfare and relocated the capital to Yendi. The Gonja followed eastward, but in 1713, Naa Zangina finally halted the Gonja attacks when he decisively defeated them and killed their chief, Kumpatia, at Sang near Yendi.

Naa Zangina not only is reputed to be the first Muslim ruler of the Dagbon, but is also credited with encouraging trade. With the relocation of the capital to Yendi and the return of peace, a Muslim community emerged at the Ya Naa's palace at Yendi. The Dyula, of Mande origin, led by Sabali-Yarna, and the Hausa Muslims, led by the Kamshe Naa, bolstered Islamic influence in the kingdom. Beginning with the Sabali-Yarna, and later the Kamshe Naa, these people became responsible for the Ya Naa's protective prayers. At the Ya Naa's palace, Muslim titles, a sign of the integration of Muslim elders into the political structure, included the Walgu Naa, who made sure that the Ya Naa had his portion to "Drink the Qur'an"; the Nayil Liman, the imam of the Ya Naa, and the Yidan Kambala, were also credited with the imamship.

The extension of trade with the Dyula, and later with the Hausa, linked the Dagbon state with neighbouring kingdoms, like the Fezzan, Egypt, and the Bight of Benin. By 1788, Yendi was said to be bigger than Kumasi and Salaga.

It was culturally closer to, and was the result of, other Sahelian kingdoms, especially to the Mossi Kingdoms, Mali Empire, Songhai Empire, and Hausa Bakwai, with which Dagbon were major trading partners for salt, kola nuts, and slaves.

In the mid 18th century, Dagbon was absorbed into the Ashanti Empire as a tributary state. The expansion of the Ashanti Empire into Dagbon is refuted by some researchers such as A.A. Lliasu. Scholar Karl J. Haas argues that "claims of Asante dominance over Dagbon in the
precolonial era have been greatly exaggerated."

Kingdoms and States that originated from Dagbon 
When Naa Gbewaa died, some of his children broke off and founded separate states including Mamprugu and Nanung.  Whiles Gbewaa was still alive, his daughter Yennenga, travelled north and founded the Mossi Kingdoms, who constitute the majority of present day Burkina Faso. Other kingdoms that emerged from Dagbon include the Bouna Kingdom of Ivory Coast, and the Dagaaba states of the Upper West Region.

Royal Houses 
There are two main houses among the royals of Dagbon. These are the House of Abudu and the House of Andani. The royals of Dagbon are skilled in statecraft, lobbying and royal politics. The current Yaa Naa is a member of the House of Andani and the leader of his military wing the Tolon Naa is from the Abudu House. Royals in Dagbon compete intensely for chieftaincy titles but work collaboratively after ascensions.

Dagbon as a British and German Protectorate (1896–1957) 
Dagbon resisted colonisation as it had a well organised and powerful army. It was a protectorate, not a colony, allowing chiefs in the Kingdom to have independence other chiefs in Southern Ghana did not have. In 1888, Dagbon became part of a neutral zone, stretching from Yeji to Yendi, that was established to forestall conflict between the Germans and the British. Dagbon had to fight the Germans to the East, resist the British to the West and South, and the French were to the North. The Germans failed to capture Dagbon after multiple attempts. After the Battle of Adibo, Yendi, the capital of Dagbon was deserted. The Gbewaa Palace was burnt and Eastern Dagbon came under German control. Western Dagbon ultimately came under British control. Yendi, where the Yaa Naa resided, came under German control, separating the Yaa Naa from his people in the west.

First German expedition in 1896 

From the point of view of German colonialists, the influential Yaan Naa Andani II had disturbed the trade route from the coast to Sansanné-Mangu, a German colonial station in the hinterland. Naa Andani, however, had already told German colonial administrator Hans Gruner beforehand that he believed that “it is the white man who makes the roads unsafe”.

In 1896, the Germans led by Valentin von Massow, Hans Gruner and Gaston Thierry clashed with the Dagomba at the Battle of Adibo, destroyed Yendi and made away with valuables. It was a massacre, as the 7,000-man, poorly equipped Dagomba army merely rushed with their bows and arrows at the 100-man well-armed German army. In 1899 the British and the Germans split Dagbon between German Togoland and the Gold Coast.

Second German expedition in 1900 
After the death of Yaa Na Andani II in August 1899, disputes over succession to the Dagbon throne were ongoing: Andani's eldest son aspired to become Na of Savelugu and had asked the Dagomba elders to promote the current Savelugu Na to supreme Yaa Naa.  However, this suggestion was met with disagreement from Alasan, Na of Karaga, who claimed the throne for himself. German colonial governor August Köhler himself supported Alasan's claim and, in late March 1900, called for a military expedition who was then led by the colonial administrator in Sansanné-Mangu, Friedrich Rigler. The latter led his troops to Yendi on 5 April 1900 but found the town deserted. Meanwhile, Na Andani's eldest son Idi had moved with his retinue to Sang in the Gold Coast colony and gathered up with those who had fled Yendi. These Dagomba thought they were protected from the Germans, but Rigler still attacked them in British territory on 7 April. The German troops killed at least 83 people in the battle, including Andani's son. After coming back to Yendi, Rigler appointed Alasan as the new Yaa Naa of Dagbon.

British colonial rule 
Following World War I, eastern Dagbon became part of the British-administered mandated territories established by the League of Nations and reunited with the west, allowing the Yaa Naa to resume control of his people. The British implemented indirect rule, in which Dagomba chiefs administered local government. This policy perpetuated Dagomba dominance over the Konkomba. The British largely neglected the economic development of Dagbon. To pay the head tax the British imposed, Dagomba had to migrate to the southern Gold Coast to work in mines and on cocoa plantations.

The Kingdom of Dagbon enjoyed a distinct constitutional position before it became part of the British Togoland.

Recent history 
Today, the Yaa Naa's court remains at Yendi. The kingdom is divided into territorial chiefdoms, categorised from divisional to village chieftaincies. Certain chieftaincies, such as Karaga, Savalugu and Mion, are reserved for the sons of the former Yaa Naa, and their occupancy qualifies one to test for the Namship, or head chiefdom, at Yendi. Lesser chieftaincies are reserved for grandsons. Succession to the Nam has always rotated among the three royal houses, now reduced to two–the Andani and the Abudu.

Over the past century, the Dagomba have faced repeated succession disputes. Following the death of Yaa-Na Mahama II in 1954, a succession dispute arose and the federal government sent troops to Yendi and intervened. 

In March 2002, Ya Naa Yakubu Andani II, from the Andani House, was murdered together with forty-two of his elders in a war by supporters of the Abudu House. After eight years, on 10 April 2010, around thirty to forty people were arrested for the murder in Yendi and parts of Accra in preparation for prosecution. 

On 16 November 2018, a Mediation Committee that consisted of three Eminent Chiefs finalized its plan to resolve the conflict in Dagbon.  The two Houses agreed to the Committees proposal that the Abudu Royal family perform the funeral rites of the late Yaa Naa Mahamadu Abdulai from 14 to 28 of December 2018. Next was to be the funeral of the late Yaa Naa Yakubu Andani II, from 4–19 January 2019. Both obsequies took place at the old Gbewaa Palace in Yendi.

Military 
The Sapashina are the military of the Kingdom. They are devided to several units. The Yaa Naa is the commander-in-chief of the Dagbon forces. The Tolon Naa is the head of th military, together with the Kumbungu Naa and the Diare Lana.

Dance 
Dance is call Waa in the Dagbani language. Dancing is an important part of the culture of Dagbon. There are several types of dances performed individually or in groups.

Group Dances

Tora 
Tora is performed by women of Dagbon. It is one of the oldest dance in the kingdom. It involve to-and-from rhythmic movement and subsequent buttock collisions.

Simpa 

The simpa is typically performed at weddings and other celebrations, and is known for its energetic, rhythmic movements and fast tempo. The dance is usually performed by a female group and a male lead, with participants forming a circle and performing a series of coordinated steps and movements to the beat of the music.

Takai 

Takai is performed in circular manner using sticks or metallic rods to knock the rod of the dancer in front and behind. In addition to its cultural significance, the Takai dance is also known for its energetic and lively nature. The dancers move with skill and grace, their feet swift and their waistlines twisting as they circle around the drummers. The sound of the drums and flutes adds to the excitement and energy of the dance, making it a thrilling and enjoyable experience for all who participate and witness it.

Jara 

Jera is a traditional dance and music of the Dagbamba people in Northern Ghana. It has a long history dating back to the Kparibas in Dagbon, who originally performed it as a religious ritual before and after hunting expeditions. Despite its origins, Jara is now enjoyed by many Dagbamba villages on a variety of occasions, including festivals, funerals, and for leisure. One of the unique aspects of Jara is that it is still performed in traditional religious costume, despite its evolution and widespread performance on diverse social occasions. This adds an element of cultural significance and respect to the dance, honoring its roots and the history of the Dagbamba people.

Jara is a beloved and respected tradition in Northern Ghana, bringing joy, peace, and a sense of community to those who participate and witness it. Its rhythmic beats and graceful movements have stood the test of time, and it is sure to continue to be enjoyed for generations to come.

Baamaaya 

Bamaya is a popular dance in the Northern Region of Ghana, often performed at public events and functions. It is typically performed by men dressed in feminine attire, accompanied by a lead dancer, other dancers, and drummers who also sing as a chorus. The dance is characterized by swift footwork and twisting of the waist, and the dancers wear beads and cymbal bells around their waists and chins that make noise as they move. The dance is accompanied by a chorus song and the sound of drums and flutes, which dictate the tempo and movement of the dance. The leader of the group communicates the movements to the rest of the dancers, and at the end of the performance, each dancer has the opportunity to showcase their individual skills. The word "Bamaya" means "the river or valley is wet" in Dagbani.

Jina 
This is religious and spititual dance practised by the Jinwarba of Dagbon. It is often performed at night with bonfires.

Solo Dances

Nagbegu 

This it one of the famous solo dances in Dagbon performed by both males and females.

Occupational Dances

Nakoha Waa or Dance of the Butchers 
Nakoha waa is a dance that originated among the butchers or Nakohanima of Dagomba society. The butchers dance were incorporated into Dagomba culture by Naa Dimani and have their own patrilineage, similar to that of the drummers or Lunsi. The Nakoha waa dance is a unique  reflecting the important role that butchers have played in the history and traditions of this society.

Dikali or Macheli Waa or Dance of the Blacksmiths 
Dikala is the music of the blacksmiths or Machelnima. The blacksmiths were incorporated into Dagomba society by Naa Luro. When Naa Luro wanted to retrieve the body of Naa Darizhagu, but had to cross a river to reach it. The blacksmiths had to be summoned to fashion tools for the woodworkers to make a bridge. The drum language for Dikala says “if you refuse a chief you will be killed,” which is a reference to the fact that the blacksmith family was originally reluctant to be part of the royal court.

Natural Resources

Mineral Resource 
The kingdom holds the largest iron ore reserve in the country.

Renewable Resource 
Dagbon has a rich flora and fauna. Trees such as shea, mango, baobab, kapok, teak, mahogany,neem,  grow abundantly. The land supports cultivation of crops such as maize, rice, guinea corn, yam, millet, sweet potato, soybean, groundnut, bambarabeans, cassava, watermelon, and many others.

Flora 
Trees:

 Adansonia digitata
 Afzelia africana
 Anogeissus leiocarpus
 Afraegle paniculata
 Burkea africana
 Butyrospermum paradoxum
 Cassia sieberana
 Celastrus senegalensis
 Combretum ghasalense
 Detarium microcarpum
 Grewia lasiodiscus
 Grewia mollis
 Lannea acida
 Maytenus senegalensis
 Piliostigma thonningii
 Pterocarpus erinaceus
 Sterculia setigera
 Tamarindus indica
 Terminalia spp., including T. avicennioides
 Ximenia americana

Shrubs:

 Diospyros mespiliformis
 Feretia apodanthera
 Flueggea virosa
 Tinnsea spp.
 Urginea spp.

Herbaceous plants:

 Abutilon ramosum
 Aneilema umbrosum
 Atylosia scarabaeoides
 Blepharis maderaspatensis
 Desmodium velutinum
 Mariscus alternifolius
 Ruellia
 Sida urens
 Triumfetta pentandra
 Wissadula amplissima

Grasslands:

 Andropogon spp., including Andropogon gayanus var. squamulatus (a tall grass)
 Brachiaria spp.
 Loudetiopsis kerstingii

Foods and Diet of Dagbon 

The kingdom has a diverse selection of foods. Common foods are Sa-am (Tuozaafi), Sakoro (pounded yam), Tuya (rice and beans), Tubani, Gablee, wasawasa, yaankahanda, yaanmonda, yaankikalli, and others.

Vegetarian foods of Dagbon 
Traditional vegetarian foods in Dagbon include Tuubaani, Gablee, wasawasa, yaankahanda, yaanmonda, Nyombeeka, Gora, etc.

Breakfast in Dagbon 
Breakfast is taken in the morning just after sunrise. Traditional breakfast is made of koko or kukuaɣli (porridge) made from either of maize, millet, guinea or a mixture of flours.

Types of porridge prepared in Dagbon 

 Za koko (made from millet)
 Chi koko (made from guinea corn)
 Koko Talli (made from maize or millet or guinea corn)
 kukuaɣ nyina (any poridge with sizeable, chewable soft maize or millet)
 Zimbeɣu (porridge whose floor is made from mixtures of floor from maize, beans, millet, soybeans and others)
 Zimbuli (porridege from unsmoothened floor)
 List of rulers of the Kingdom of Dagbon
 Adibo dali
 Dagbani language
 Fire Festival In Dagbon
 Damba festival
 Notable Dagombas

References

Dagbon
History of Ghana
West Africa
Former monarchies of Africa
Former countries in Africa